The Ile Warramous Island  is a small uninhabited islet about 1.28 kilometres (0.80 miles) east coast of Djibouti in the Gulf of Tadjoura and Gulf of Aden. The island lies near the city of Djibouti. The island is not open for the public with no civil population

Islands of Djibouti